Norte de Minas is one of the twelve mesoregions of the Brazilian state of Minas Gerais. It is composed of 89 municipalities, distributed across 7 microregions.

References 

Mesoregions of Minas Gerais